Crumpsall tram stop is a light rail station in the suburban area of Crumpsall, Greater Manchester, England. It is on the Bury Line of Greater Manchester's light rail Metrolink system.

Services
Crumpsall, along with the other Bury Line stations, closed as a heavy rail station in 1991 and reopened as a light rail station in 1992. The station forms part of Ticketing Zone 2 and is the stop for North Manchester General Hospital, which can be reached by connecting bus services. The station installed cycle lockers in July 2011.

Crumpsall serves as a Metrolink stop for both Altrincham to Bury services, and Bury to Piccadilly services. Services mostly run every 12 minutes on these two routes, resulting in a 6-minute service between Bury and Manchester at peak times.

There are also going to be services to The Trafford Centre on the Trafford Park line from 2021.

Refurbishment
In May 2015, the Greater Manchester Combined Authority released a report into the potential building of Metrolink's proposed Trafford Park line advising on the outlined plans and their financial implications. Approval to build the line was granted in October 2016.

A turnback facility is to be implemented to allow additional services. In July 2017, Transport for Greater Manchester and Metrolink announced that works would commence at Crumpsall tram stop in preparation for the new Trafford Park line joining the Metrolink network with an expected completion date of mid-2018.

In December 2017 works began at the station to build a third platform for trams to terminate on the Trafford Park Line. This also saw the construction of a new foot crossing at the bottom of the platforms, completed on 7 February 2018. The footbridge was then demolished two days later, meaning currently, the Manchester-bound platform is only accessible via the foot-crossing at the bottom of the Bury-bound platform, although the station's accessibility has not been compromised.

In the April 2019 Bank Holiday, a section of track was replaced with points south of the station, these points currently allow trams to cross from the north-bound line to the south-bound line and then across onto the track that will eventually lead into Platform 3.

Over the 2019 May Bank Holiday weekend (4 - 6 May), the Manchester bound platform was resurfaced, and the disabled access ‘tiles’ were added to the newly installed third platform at the stop. Two new waiting shelters were also installed on the south-end of platforms 2 & 3 with a new passenger information display and seating. The basic concrete foundations for the stair and ramp access to Crumpsall Lane from platform 3, has also been added.

Connecting bus services
Crumpsall is served by First Greater Manchester service 88, 89, 149 and 154.

References

External links

Metrolink stop information
Crumpsall area map

Tram stops in Manchester
Former Lancashire and Yorkshire Railway stations
Railway stations in Great Britain opened in 1889
Railway stations in Great Britain closed in 1991
Railway stations in Great Britain opened in 1992
Tram stops on the Altrincham to Bury line
Tram stops on the Bury to Ashton-under-Lyne line